Deh-e Morteza (also Romanized as Deh-e Morteẕá and Deh Morteẕá; also known as Deh Murteza) is a village in Golzar Rural District, in the Central District of Bardsir County, Kerman Province, Iran. At the 2006 census, its population was 118, in 24 families.

References 

Populated places in Bardsir County